Between 1993 and 1996, the McDonnell Douglas DC-X, also known as the "Delta Clipper", conducted twelve low-altitude suborbital test launches to verify the configuration and handling of the 
uncrewed single-stage-to-orbit Delta Clipper design, which was proposed to the United States Department of Defense and the National Aeronautics and Space Administration (NASA) for use as a reuseable launch vehicle. Claimed as the first rocket to conduct a vertical landing on Earth, the DC-X was a one-third scale demonstrator for the proposed operational Delta Clipper vehicle.

After the first three flights Strategic Defense Initiative Organization funding for the test project was cancelled; the remaining test program was conducted by NASA and the Advanced Research Projects Agency. Following the eighth test flight, the vehicle was transferred fully to NASA and the vehicle was modified to DC-XA configuration, also known as "Clipper Graham" after General Daniel O. Graham who had died in 1995 after supporting the Delta Clipper project.

Of the overall test program, ten of the vehicle's launches were fully successful; the fifth test flight was aborted early in the flight following an on-board explosion but the vehicle was successfully recovered. The twelfth and final flight saw one of the vehicle's landing legs fail to extend; on landing, when the vehicle tipped over onto its unsupported corner, a liquid oxygen tank ruptured and exploded, the ensuing fire destroying the modified DC-XA vehicle and ending the program. Despite the loss the program was considered overall to have been a success.

Launch history

References

DC-X